Arvis W. Davis (June 13, 1943 – September 23, 2014) was an American basketball player and coach.  Davis is best known for his All-American college career at the University of Tennessee (UT).  He was known by several nicknames, including the "Rutledge Rifle" and "The Man With the Golden Arm."

Davis, a 6"7' center, came to Tennessee from Rutledge, Tennessee, where he once scored 71 points in a game.  In his three-year college career (freshmen were ineligible at this time), Davis scored 1,255 points (17.3 per game) and 574 rebounds (8.1 per game).  As a senior, Davis averaged 19.6 points and 8.2 points per game and was named a first team All-American by the United States Basketball Writers Association, the first player in program history so honored.  He was also named first-team All-Southeastern Conference and a third team All-American by the Associated Press and United Press International.

Following the close of his college career, Davis was drafted in the fifth round of the 1965 NBA draft (43rd pick overall), but never played in the league.  He began his coaching career in 1966 at McMinn Central High School in Englewood, Tennessee.  In 1969 he was named an assistant at his alma mater, and in 1975 was named head coach at Walters State Community College in Morristown, Tennessee.  He left in 1979 to pursue a business career.  He later spent several years as an announcer for UT games.

Davis is a member of the University of Tennessee athletic Hall of Fame and the Tennessee Sports Hall of Fame.  In 2009, he was named to UT's All-Century team.

Davis died at the age of 71 on September 23, 2014 at the University of Tennessee Medical Center in Knoxville, Tennessee.

References

External links
 Tennessee Sports HOF profile

1943 births
2014 deaths
All-American college men's basketball players
American men's basketball coaches
Basketball players from Tennessee
Centers (basketball)
High school basketball coaches in Tennessee
Junior college men's basketball coaches in the United States
Los Angeles Lakers draft picks
People from Rutledge, Tennessee
Tennessee Volunteers basketball coaches
Tennessee Volunteers basketball players
Basketball coaches from Tennessee
American men's basketball players